Rabdophaga karschi is a gall midge which forms galls on the twigs of sallows (Salix species).

Description
The genus Salix supports many galls, some of which are difficult to identify, particularly those caused by the gall midges in the genus Rabdophaga. R. karschi forms galls on the twigs of sallows. The gall is an approximately 3 mm wide, slender, spindle-shaped swelling of a twig. There is one red larva or a pupa and the larva makes an exit hole in the galled stem or occasionally in a bud.

Distribution
The gall has been found in the Czech Republic, Great Britain and the Netherlands.

Notes

References

karschi
Nematoceran flies of Europe
Gall-inducing insects
Insects described in 1891
Taxa named by Jean-Jacques Kieffer
Willow galls